Robert Miller is a Jamaican Labour Party politician currently serving as Member of Parliament for Saint Catherine South Eastern since 2020.

References 

Living people
21st-century Jamaican politicians
Members of the House of Representatives of Jamaica
Jamaica Labour Party politicians
People from Saint Catherine Parish
Year of birth missing (living people)
Members of the 14th Parliament of Jamaica